Mahasathi Arundathi is a 1968 Indian Kannada-language film, directed by Aruru Pattabhi and produced by B. V. Reddy. The film stars Rajkumar, Kalpana, Udaykumar and Arun Kumar. The film has musical score by K. S. Ashwathama.

Cast
Rajkumar as Vasishtha
Kalpana
Udaykumar
Arun Kumar as Narada

References

1968 films
1960s Kannada-language films